Finalmente la felicità is a 2011 film directed by and starring Leonardo Pieraccioni.

Plot
Benedetto is a music professor of Lucca, who discovers that his recently died mother adopted a Brazilian girl. The girl is now working as a model and she is coming to Italy to know her brother.

Cast

References

External links

2011 films
Italian comedy films
2010s Italian-language films
Films directed by Leonardo Pieraccioni
Films set in Lucca
Films shot in Sardinia
2010s Italian films